Mannara Chopra (born 25 May 1991) is an Indian actress and model who predominantly works in Telugu films as well as a few Hindi and Tamil films. She is the paternal cousin of actresses Priyanka Chopra and Parineeti Chopra. She made her Bollywood debut with the film Zid (2014).

Early life 
Mannara Chopra was born in Ambala Cantonment, Haryana. Her name Mannara, is Greek for "something that shines". Mannara's mother is a jewellery designer and her father is a lawyer. Her mother, Priyanka Chopra's father and Parineeti Chopra's father are siblings. She has a younger sister, Mitali, who has studied commerce and is a fashion stylist. Mannara was educated at Summer Fields School, New Delhi, and pursued a BBA degree and is a fashion designer.

Career 
After completing her education in Delhi, Mannara moved to Mumbai, where she started her career in modelling and moved into advertising. She made 40 commercials, Suzuki with Salman khan, Dulex paints with Farhan Akhtar, Parle Marie with director Imtaz Ali she was the original face of Ganna.com commercial, Myntra, three of them alongside her cousin Priyanka Chopra, including one for Dabur Amla Hair Oil, which she said won her "instant recognition" and landed her an offer in Telugu films. She had also appeared in Amit Trivedi's song '"Bas bajna chahiye", the theme song for Gaana. Before making her film debut, she also worked as a fashion designer and as an assistant choreographer, being trained in dance forms like hip hop and belly dancing. She is currently shooting with Director Teja for his forthcoming film alongside Kajal Aggarwal. She has played lead roles in Telugu cinema in thikka, Rogue, Jakkanna. She is seen as a showstopper in leading Fashion Weeks and events as well, last seen at India Runway Week (2018).

Acting Career (2014–present) 

By 2014, Mannara ventured into acting, signing up for films in Telugu, Hindi and Kannada. Her first release was the Telugu film Prema Geema Jantha Nai (2014), then credited under her birth name, which featured her as a "very talkative college going girl". The same year, Mannara made her Bollywood debut with Anubhav Sinha's Zid, co-starring Karanvir Sharma. Her portrayal of an obsessive lover was met with mixed reviews. Mohar Basu called her "radiant" though noted that, she needed "a good deal more of experience". However, the film was a commercially profitable venture.
 
Soon after she made three Telugu films: Jakkanna (2016), which was a hit at the box office; Thikka (2016), and Rogue (2017) for which she received good reviews.

Filmography

Web series

Music Videos

Awards and nominations

References

External links

 
 
 

Living people
People from Ambala
Indian film actresses
21st-century Indian actresses
Actresses in Telugu cinema
Actresses in Hindi cinema
Actresses in Tamil cinema
Actresses in Kannada cinema
Actresses from Haryana
1991 births